The 2017 Asian Canoe Slalom Championships were the 10th Asian Canoe Slalom Championships and took place from February 24–26, 2017 at the Khun Dan Prakan Chon Dam, Nakhon Nayok, Thailand.

Medal summary

Individual

Team

Medal table

References

Results

External links
Japan Canoe Federation

Asian Canoe Slalom Championships
Canoe
Asian Canoeing Championships
International sports competitions hosted by Thailand